Qingtongxia (Xiao'erjing: ٿٍْ‌طْوثِيَا شِ) is a city in north-central Ningxia, China. Administratively, Qingtongxia  is a county-level city within the prefecture-level city of Wuzhong. It is located on the left (northwestern) bank of the Yellow River, opposite and a bit upstream of Wuzhong main urban area, and borders Inner Mongolia to the west.

Qingtongxia had 264,717 residents in 2010. Many residents of Qingtongxia are Hui Muslim.

Places of interest
On the bank of the Yellow River outside the city of Qingtongxia is the site of 108 Buddhist stupas which were constructed during the Western Xia period.

Economy
Qingtongxia Dam on the Yellow River is located in Qingtongxia. A major irrigation canal branches off the river near the dam and runs north.

Administrative divisions
Qingtongxia City has 1 subdistrict 7 towns and 2 farms.
1 subdistrict
 Yumin

7 towns
 Xiaoba
 Chenyuantan
 Xiakou
 Qujing
 Yesheng
 Qingtongxia
 Daba

2 others  farms
 Shuxin Forestry Farm
 Lianhu Farm

Climate

References

 
Cities in Ningxia
Wuzhong, Ningxia
County-level divisions of Ningxia